Alabama's 4th Senate district is one of 35 districts that elect Senators to the Alabama Senate. The district has been represented by Garlan Gudger since 2018, defeating incumbent Paul Bussman in a primary election.

Geography
The district covers, in whole or in part, the counties of Cullman, Lawrence, Marion, and Winston.

Recent Elections

2018

Republican primary

General election

2014

Republican primary

General election

References

04